Jerrara is a locality in the Municipality of Kiama, in the Illawarra region of New South Wales, Australia.

References 

Suburbs of Wollongong
Municipality of Kiama